The 1888 United States presidential election in New Hampshire took place on November 6, 1888, as part of the 1888 United States presidential election. Voters chose four representatives, or electors to the Electoral College, who voted for president and vice president.

New Hampshire voted for the Republican nominee, Benjamin Harrison, over the Democratic nominee, incumbent President Grover Cleveland. Harrison won the state by a narrow margin of 2.50%.

This would be the last election when bellwether Coös County in the far north voted for a losing presidential candidate until voting for Hubert Humphrey over Richard Nixon in 1968. It would also be the last election when a Democratic presidential candidate carried Merrimack and Rockingham Counties until 1912, when the Republican Party was divided between Progressive Theodore Roosevelt and conservative incumbent Taft, and the last when those went Democratic in a two-way contest until Lyndon Johnson in 1964.

Results

Results by county

See also
 United States presidential elections in New Hampshire

Notes

References

New Hampshire
1888
1888 New Hampshire elections